The Hamilton Library at the University of Hawaii at Mānoa is the largest research library in the state of Hawaii. The Library serves as a key resource for the flagship Manoa campus (a land, sea and space grant institution) as well as the other University of Hawaii system campuses.

It was designed by George Hogan who designed numerous houses on the island including Plantation Estate which was used by Barack Obama as his Winter White House.

Description
Hamilton Library is located at the University of Hawaii at Mānoa, at 2550 McCarthy Mall. It is composed of a circulating research library combined with a non-lending research library system.

As of June 2013, the Library has a full-time equivalent of 46 library faculty and 31 other professional staff, 58 support staff, and 46 student assistants. The collections contain 3,102,696 volumes, 2,353,143 microform units,  of manuscripts and archives, 112,000 audiovisual items, 200,000 maps and 100,000 aerial photographs, over 150,000 digital maps and aerials and approximately 70,751 current serial/journal titles received in paper, microform and/or electronic format. Total expenditures for monographic and serial materials in all formats and personnel were $14,426,748 in 2013. The Library operates by using the Ex Libris ALMA library services platform and PRIMO Discovery system.  Among the 115 North American university research library members of ARL, UH Manoa Library is ranked 79th in strength based on factors such as collection size, current serial subscriptions, staffing, and budget. UH Manoa Hamilton Library is ranked 77th in the nation's largest libraries by the American Library Association.

Collections are housed in two on-campus buildings: Hamilton Library and Sinclair Library (Student Success Center). The  Hamilton Library is home to the music collection, course reserve reading service, Wong Audiovisual Center, and older, bound journals. Hamilton contains a student computer lab and provide reference and other services.

During 2013-14, the library faculty and staff assisted in 21,054 reference transactions, 207,346 circulation transactions including reserves, and 25,424 interlibrary loan transactions. Through their instructional activities, the Library faculty support the Mānoa General Education and other campus requirements for student information literacy. During 2013/14, the Library faculty taught 528 undergraduate and graduate instructional sessions involving 7,382 students. In addition, Library faculty taught courses in the Library and Information Science Program of the Information and Computer Science Department.

Area Collections

Asia 
The Asia Collection is the most significant collection of Asian materials in the State of Hawaii. It dates from 1920, when the University of Hawaii Board of Regents established the Japanese Department.  The Oriental Institute was established in 1930 to support study of China, India and Japan. The East-West Center (EWC) acquired the vernacular language (CJK( materials of the Oriental Library in 1962.  The Research Libraries of the EWC expanded the scope of Asia regional studies to include Korea and all countries in South and Southeast Asia. In 1970, the Asia Collection was transferred from the EWC back to the University of Hawaii Library. The collection has specialist librarian faculty for the following areas:
 China 
Materials related to China are integrated into the East (Chinese language) and Asia Collection (English & other western languages) of Hamilton Library.

 Japan 
Materials related to Japan are integrated into the East (Japanese language) and Asia Collection (English & other western languages) of Hamilton Library. The Japan Collection also holds a number of unique/rare collections housed in the Asia Special Collections room.

 Korea 
Materials related to Korean studies are located in the East (한글(Hangul/Korean) and Asia Collection (English & other western languages) of Hamilton Library.

 Okinawa 
Materials are currently part of the Japan area studies. The Hawaii State Legislature established the Center for Okinawan Studies effective fiscal year 2008. House Bill no. 1025 of the 2013 Hawaii State Legislature Relating to the Center for Okinawan Studies provided funding for a full-time Okinawan studies librarian position at the University of Hawaii at Manoa library.

 Philippines 
The Philippine Collection at the University of Hawai'i is one of the largest Philippine collections in the United States.  It has research and rare materials in various formats, integrated into the Asia Collection.

 South Asia 
The South Asia collection in Hamilton Library acquires materials published in South Asia through a cooperative Library of Congress acquisition program. Additional materials published outside of South Asia are also purchased. For this collection, the South Asia region includes Afghanistan, Bhutan, Bangladesh, India, Nepal, Pakistan, and Sri Lanka.

 Southeast Asia 
Materials related to Southeast Asia are integrated into the Asia Collection of Hamilton Library.  The regions covered in the collection include: Brunei, Burma, Cambodia, Indonesia, Laos, Malaysia, Singapore, Thailand, Timor Lestem Vietnam.

Hawaii 
The Hawaiian Collection at the University of Hawai'i at Mānoa Library is a comprehensive collection of retrospective and current materials pertaining to Hawai'i. Material pertaining to all aspects of Hawaii and at all levels of writing are collected in print and non-print formats. It is housed on the fifth floor of Hamilton Library in the combined Hawaiian/Pacific Collection.

Pacific 
The Pacific Collection is internationally recognized for the excellence of its holdings and has materials relating to the island regions of Melanesia, Micronesia and Polynesia. It is housed on the fifth floor of Hamilton Library in the combined Hawaiian/Pacific Collection. Audiovisual materials related to the Pacific are housed in the Wong Audiovisual Center at Sinclair Library.

Special Collections
Hamilton Library has several special collections, many are combined in the Archives & Manuscripts Department, located on the 5th floor of the Hamilton Library Addition. The Archives & Manuscript unit also includes the Hawaii War Records Depository (HWRD) and the Japanese American Veterans Collection (JAVC). The Jean Charlot Collection is a standalone unit located across the hall from the Hawaiian/Pacific Collection. Other rare materials are located in various parts of the Library and from 2009-early 2015 were accessed via a quasi-unit known as Special Research Collections.

Manuscripts 
The Manuscript Collections document the people, history, culture, and politics of Hawaii. It includes:
 Ronald Stone Anderson Papers
 Marjorie Grant Whiting Papers
 Arthur Goodfriend Papers
 Robert Baker Aitken Papers
 Institute of Pacific Relations Records
 Pacific & Asian Affairs Council Records
 Pan Pacific Union Records
 World War II Manuscript Collections
 Hawaii Congressional Papers Collection
 Democratic Party Records

University Archives 
This collection is a repository for official and unofficial records of the history of the University of Hawaii at Manoa, as well as selected state and local history materials pertaining to the university. It includes material on labor relations and ethnic relations in Hawaii.

Memberships
The UH Manoa Library maintains memberships in academic and professional consortia and organizations including:
 Greater Western Library Alliance (GWLA)
 Research Libraries Group (now merged with OCLC) 
 Association of Research Libraries (ARL) 
 OCLC 
 Pacific Rim Research Libraries Alliance (PRRLA) - formerly called Pacific Rim Digital Library Alliance (PRDLA)

Institutional Repository and Digital Research Collections
The University of Hawai'i is a participant in the Open access (publishing) community. In December 2010 the faculty of the University of Hawaii at Manoa committed to disseminating its research and scholarship as widely as possible by adopting an Open Access Policy. (See: Open access mandate)
ScholarSpace
ScholarSpace is an institutional repository for the digital scholarly output for the University of Hawai‘i at Mānoa (UHM) faculty, researchers and students. Contributors maintain copyright to their submissions and can control access to their collections.  The digital repository serves to capture, index, store, makes searchable, disseminate, and preserve digital materials which include scholarly communications, theses and dissertations, technical reports, teaching materials, images, multimedia clips, interactive teaching programs, data sets, and databases.

System & Organization
ScholarSpace uses the open-source software, DSpace, that provides a permanent and stable storage. DSpace was developed by MIT Libraries and Hewlett-Packard Company. The database is maintained and coordinated by Desktop Network Services of the UHM Library. The project focuses on developing a system to support the storage and use of digital materials for undergraduate, graduate, and faculty learning and other purposes.
ScholarSpace is organized primarily into Communities, Sub-communities, and Collections. Communities are groups that present content to the database and may include departments, labs, research centers, schools, or another unit within an institution.  Communities may be further separated into Sub-communities. Collections are housed within these Communities and/or Sub-communities and contain the actual content which includes individual audio, visual (photographs & illustrations), and textual files (articles, papers, notes, dissertations, theses, etc.), as well as web pages, videos, computer programs.

eVols
eVols is a digital repository for Hamilton Library research and rare materials which are digitally reformatted or scanned for digital access. It includes material which the library digitizes as part of grant projects and digital library program initiatives, and provides access via a permanent web location. The library has received funding for digital conversion from the Greater Western Library Alliance (GWLA), National Endowment for the Humanities (NEH), the Library of Congress, the Oakland Museum of California, the Pacific Rim Digital Library Alliance (PRDLA) and University of the Ryukyu.  eVols stores digitized rare books, archived newspapers, full-text journals, photographs, video, and sound files.

Digital Image Collections
Hamilton Library offers almost 40 Digital & Digitized Collections showcasing important, previously hidden, visual and archival material from the Asia, Hawaii, Pacific and Rare collections.

Directors
Caroline (Carrie) P. Green 1907 to 1908 - Acting Librarian 1908 to 1912 
Elizabeth Bryan 1913 to 1919 
Clara Hemenway 1919 to 1928 
Mary Pringle 1926 to 1928 - Acting Librarian 
Mary Pringle 1928 to 1943 
Carl G. Stroven  1943 to 1966 
Ralph R. Shaw (Appointed as Dean of Library Activities) 1966 to 1969 
Stanley West 1969 to 1977 
Donald L. Bosseau 1977 to 1982 
Robert Stevens April to August 1982 - Acting Librarian 
Ira Harris August to December 1982 - Acting Librarian 
John R. Haak 1983 to 2000 
Jean H. Ehrhorn, Interim University Librarian July 2000 to December 2001 
Diane Perushek  2001 to 2006,
Paula Mochida, Interim University Librarian, January 2006 to December 2011
Gregg Geary, Interim University Librarian, January 2012 to July 2013
Irene Herold, University Librarian, August 2013 to June 2017
Monica Ghosh, Interim University Librarian, June 2017 to December 2019
Clement “Clem” Guthro, University Librarian, January 2020 to Present

See also
Association of Public and Land-grant Universities

References

Further reading
University of Hawai'i Library Histories 25 full-text open access documents, retrieved February 6, 2015

Libraries in Hawaii
University of Hawaiʻi
Federal depository libraries
Libraries established in 1908
1908 establishments in Hawaii